Wejsce  is a village in the administrative district of Gmina Kocierzew Południowy, within Łowicz County, Łódź Voivodeship, in central Poland.

References

 Central Statistical Office (GUS) Population: Size and Structure by Administrative Division - (2007-12-31) (in Polish) 

Wejsce